Índica is an Argentine psychedelic rock music band formed in the year 2006 in Buenos Aires, Argentina by Rubén Farzati and David Vera. The band is named after a counterculture art gallery of the late 60s, Indica Gallery, located in Masons Yard, London, England.

History
Rubén Farzati and David Vera formed Indica to form a unique and personal musical project, trying to generate a space unexisting in the musical scenario. 
By the end of 2006, Índica decided to independently edit its first album called “Liebe” and starts a tour of concerts until the year 2008 when the band caught the people and several musical producers attention. In a concert in “La Trastienda” organized by Sonica/Speedy for the “selection of bands” for the Pepsi Music 2008, Índica met the music and producer Daniel Melero, who delighted with this unknown band's music, decided to record and produce them. Due to the great musical impact Índica generated in the “selection of bands”, it is selected finalist and performs in the megafestival Pepsi Music 2008, obtaining also a discographic contract with “Arroz Discos” and its distribution by Sony Music.

Members
Line-up:
 Rubén Farzati - Lead vocals, Guitar
 David Vera - Lead vocals, Bass
 Guillermo Rodríguez - Guitar
 Matías Gallipoli - drums

Past members
 Pablo Fabregat - Guitar
 Gastón Del Popolo - drums
 Walter Von Specht - Guitar

Discography

Albums
 Liebe - 2006
 Virgen de electrones - 2009 / Arroz Discos (ARG) / PopArt (ARG) / Sony Music (ARG) 
 Octonírico - 2015 / RED (ARG) / Ultrapop (ARG)

Singles
 "Astrolab" - 2009
 "En Trance" - 2009
 "Cassius Clay" - 2009
 "Amanecer Solo" - 2009
 "Próximo recuerdo" - 2015
 "S.O.S." - 2015
 "Funeral" - 2015
 "¿Adónde fue?" - 2015

References 

 Best 2015 álbums
 IndieHearts Interview
 Wipe Review 
 Vorterix Radio Interview
 Rolling Stones Review
 Rock Com Ar Review

External links
 Índica Official Website
 Índica Official Youtube

Argentine alternative rock groups
Musical groups established in 2000
Sony BMG artists
Psychedelic rock music groups